Dactylaea is a genus of flowering plants belonging to the family Apiaceae.

Its native range is Tibet to Southern Central China.

Species:

Dactylaea schizopetala 
Dactylaea wolffiana

References

Apiaceae
Apiaceae genera